Jean Elizabeth Smart (born September 13, 1951) is an American actress. After beginning her career in regional theater in the Pacific Northwest, she appeared on Broadway in 1981 as Marlene Dietrich in the biographical play Piaf. Smart was later cast in a leading role as Charlene Frazier Stillfield on the CBS sitcom Designing Women, in which she starred from 1986 to 1991.

Smart was nominated for the Tony Award for Best Actress in a Play for the 2000 Broadway revival of The Man Who Came to Dinner, and she received two Primetime Emmy Awards for her role as Lana Gardner on the NBC sitcom Frasier (2000–01). She won a third Emmy Award for her supporting role as Regina Newley on the ABC sitcom Samantha Who? (2007–09). She also portrayed Martha Logan on the action drama series 24 (2006–07). Smart is also known for her recurring voice role in Kim Possible (2002–2007) as the main character's mom. In the past decade Smart has seen a resurgence acting in television series, such as FX's Fargo (2015) and Legion (2017–2019), both created by Noah Hawley, as well as in the HBO projects Watchmen (2019), Mare of Easttown, and Hacks (both 2021), the latter three earning her Primetime Emmy Award nominations, with Hacks winning her the Primetime Emmy Award for Outstanding Lead Actress in a Comedy Series and the Golden Globe Award for Best Actress - Television Series Musical or Comedy. Smart is only the second actress, after  Betty White, to win all three comedy Emmy nominations - comedy lead, supporting, and guest categories.

Smart's film credits include The Brady Bunch Movie (1995), Sweet Home Alabama (2002), Garden State (2004), I Heart Huckabees (2004), Youth in Revolt (2009), The Accountant (2016), A Simple Favor (2018), and Babylon (2022). She received an Independent Spirit Award nomination for Guinevere (1999).

Early life
Smart was born and raised in Seattle, Washington, the daughter of Kathleen Marie "Kay" (Sanders) and Douglas Alexander Smart, a teacher. She is the second of four children. Smart was diagnosed with type 1 diabetes when she was 13 years old. Her father was a first-generation Scottish-American. On Season 10 of the television show Who Do You Think You Are?, Smart discovered she is a maternal descendant of Dorcas Hoar, one of the last women convicted of witchcraft during the Salem witch trials.

She is a 1969 graduate of Ballard High School in Seattle; it was there that she gained an interest in acting in the drama program. She graduated from the University of Washington Professional Actors Training Program with a BFA. Smart is a member of the University of Washington chapter of the Alpha Delta Pi sorority.

Career

1975–1984: Early work; theater
After graduating from college, Smart began her career appearing in regional theater throughout the Pacific Northwest, including in Washington, Alaska, and Oregon. She performed with the Seattle Repertory Theater as well as the Oregon Shakespeare Festival in Ashland, Oregon.  In the mid-1970s, she moved to New York City with college friend and fellow actress, Elizabeth Wingate (Lavery), and began working in Off-Broadway and professional regional productions.

In 1980, she appeared as Lady Macbeth at the Pittsburgh Public Theater opposite Tom Atkins as Macbeth and Keith Fowler as Macduff. In 1981, Smart was nominated for a Drama Desk Award for her performance in the Off-Broadway play Last Summer at Bluefish Cove. In February 1981, Smart appeared in a Broadway production of Piaf playing Marlene Dietrich, a role which she later reprised for the 1984 television version.

In addition to theater, Smart began working in television in several smaller to mid-size guest parts in the late 1970s and early 1980s, appearing on The Facts of Life, Alice, and Remington Steele among several others. According to Smart, after roles on the short-lived series Teachers Only and Reggie in 1983, "casting directors just decided I was funny. When that happens, you usually get pigeonholed, but I was fortunate. I got to move back and forth." The following year, she had a supporting part in the thriller Flashpoint (1984).

1985–1999: Designing Women; film
 
In 1985, Smart was cast in the starring role of Charlene Frazier Stillfield on the comedy series Designing Women, a role she played from the show's beginning in 1986 through its fifth season. After leaving Designing Women, her work mostly concentrated within made-for-television movies and supporting roles in films. Notably she portrayed serial killer Aileen Wuornos in the TV movie Overkill: The Aileen Wuornos Story (1992), followed by a supporting part in the black comedy Mistress (1992), opposite Robert De Niro and Eli Wallach. Critic Roger Ebert praised the film and called Smart's character portrayal "calculating."

The following year, she appeared in the family drama Homeward Bound: The Incredible Journey (1993), and as Ory Baxter in a television version of The Yearling (1994). She was then cast as Sally Brewton in the television miniseries Scarlett (1995), and appeared in a supporting role in The Brady Bunch Movie (1995). She also appeared in the television thriller film A Stranger In Town (1995) opposite Gregory Hines.

In 1995, Smart was cast as the lead in the comedy series High Society, which co-starred Mary McDonnell and ran for 13 episodes, followed by a role opposite Nancy McKeon in another short-lived CBS sitcom, Style & Substance. Other roles included a part in Neil Simon's The Odd Couple II (1998), and as Deborah Sloane in the drama Guinevere (1999). She had a lead role in the comedy Forever Fabulous (1999) as an aging beauty queen.

2000s: Frasier, Broadway, TV roles

In 2000, Smart was cast as Lana Gardner in the critically acclaimed comedy series Frasier, acting opposite Kelsey Grammer, set in her home town of Seattle. She went on to win two Primetime Emmy Awards for Outstanding Guest Actress in a Comedy Series. Reflecting on the role, Smart said: "I had loved that role on Frasier so much, particularly that first episode. It’s nice to get nominated and win for something you were particularly proud of. At the time I was a little bit snobby about doing guest parts. Based on what I don’t know. It wasn’t something I was seeking. But my agent said, 'You have to read this.' I thought it was hilarious and the show was brilliant so I didn't even hesitate. I remember when we did the table read with the rest of the cast we could hardly get through it we were laughing so hard."

The same year, she played in a Broadway revival production of The Man Who Came to Dinner, which earned her a Tony Award nomination. Soon after, she landed roles in several high-profile films including Sweet Home Alabama (2002), playing the mother-in-law of Reese Witherspoon, and in the comedy Bringing Down The House (2002), opposite Queen Latifah. She also had a supporting role in the independent drama Garden State (2004). Between 2000 and 2004, Smart played the role of Supervisor of Detectives and ex-wife to Chief Jack Mannion of the Metropolitan Police Department on The District.

From 2002 to 2007, she voiced Dr. Ann Possible in Kim Possible, and also provided the voice of the alcoholic chain-smoking, Pickles Oblong, on The Oblongs. In 2004, she reprised her voice role as Reba Heyerdahl in an episode of the Nickelodeon series Hey Arnold! The same year, she was cast in a lead role in the short-lived Center of the Universe. She also had a supporting role in David O. Russell's I Heart Huckabees (2004).

In January 2006, Smart joined the cast of the Fox series 24, playing the mentally unstable First Lady of the United States, Martha Logan, to actor Gregory Itzin's President Charles Logan. She received back-to-back Emmy nominations for Outstanding Supporting Actress in a Drama Series and Outstanding Guest Actress in a Drama for the role in 2006 and 2007. She also appeared in several films between 2006 and 2010, including the Curtis Hanson drama, Lucky You (2007), opposite Drew Barrymore; Youth in Revolt (2009); and the independent comedy Barry Munday (2010).

Smart won her third Emmy Award for Best Supporting Actress in a Comedy Series for portraying Samantha's overbearing mother in the sitcom Samantha Who?, opposite Christina Applegate, which she played from 2007 to 2009. She later was cast as Hawaii Governor Pat Jameson during the first season of the CBS-TV remake of Hawaii Five-0.

2010s: Fargo and Watchmen

In 2012, Smart was nominated for a Primetime Emmy Award for Outstanding Guest Actress in a Drama Series for her role in Harry's Law. She then had a supporting role in the Lifetime film Call Me Crazy: A Five Film (2013).

In 2015, Smart starred in the second season of the FX television series Fargo, portraying Floyd Gerhardt. Floyd's husband heads Fargo's most prominent organized crime syndicate, and she is forced to take over after her husband suffers a debilitating stroke. She later finds herself having to lead the Gerhardt dynasty and deal with her sons, who are vying to replace their father. For her performance, Smart won the Critics' Choice Television Award for Best Supporting Actress in a Movie/Miniseries, and was nominated for the Primetime Emmy Award for Outstanding Supporting Actress in a Limited Series or Movie. She worked with Hawley again on Legion,  in which she played Melanie Bird, a therapist who works with the protagonist David Haller.

In 2016, Smart had a role in the thriller The Accountant, opposite Ben Affleck, Anna Kendrick, and John Lithgow. In 2018, Smart played a guardian angel, to co-star Candace Cameron, in the Hallmark Channel television film A Shoe Addict's Christmas, which aired Sunday November 25, 2018.

In 2019, Smart portrayed Laurie Juspeczyk in the HBO superhero drama limited series Watchmen based on characters from the graphic novel of the same name. Smart plays as Laurie Blake formerly the second Silk Spectre, who has since become an FBI agent and member of the Anti-Vigilante Task Force. Smart starred alongside Regina King, Jeremy Irons, Yahya Abdul-Mateen II and Louis Gossett Jr. Smart's performance was singled out by critics including Eric Deggans of NPR who described her performance as "compelling" and "the always-excellent Jean Smart [playing] a cynical, heroically-damaged middle-aged version of Laurie Juspecyk." The series received critical acclaim winning 11 Primetime Emmy Awards including Outstanding Limited Series. Smart herself was nominated for Primetime Emmy Award for Outstanding Supporting Actress in a Limited Series or Movie and received the Critics' Choice Television Award for Best Supporting Actress in a Drama Series for her performance.

2020s: Hacks and continued acclaim 
In 2021, Smart has appeared in the seven episode HBO crime drama limited series Mare of Easttown set in a small town in Pennsylvania. The series stars Kate Winslet as a grizzled detective with a supporting cast which includes Guy Pearce, Julianne Nicholson, and Evan Peters. Her role as Winslet's mother has earned her critical acclaim with Jackson McHenry of Variety writing, "It’s one of those essential truths of TV, as Watchmen and Legion displayed recently, that if you need a tough-as-nails broad, you hire Jean Smart. Smart has the voice and the timing to play a stern matriarch, and whenever she’s onscreen in Mare of Easttown, she wrenches away the spotlight like she’s grabbing a juice box."

She also stars as the lead in the HBO Max dark comedy series Hacks (2021) playing a legendary Las Vegas comedy diva looking to appeal to a younger audience. USA Today declared Smart, at the age of 69, "The Queen of HBO", after appearing in Watchmen, Mare of Easttown and now Hacks. Glen Weldon of NPR praised Smart's performance in his review writing, "I don't know if the role of Deborah Vance was written for Smart, but she certainly makes it seem like it was...Smart's also convincing as a standup, performing Deborah's vaguely hokey routines with a naturalistic flair as if she was born to it."

In 2021, Smart co-starred in the romantic comedy film Senior Moment with William Shatner and Christopher Lloyd. In 2022, she played Peg, the grandmother of Kiernan Shipka's character Bea Johnson, in Wildflower.

In 2022, Smart appeared in Damien Chazelle's 1920's period comedy-drama film Babylon as gossip columnist Elinor St. John.

Personal life
Smart was married to actor Richard Gilliland, whom she met while working on the set of Designing Women (he played J.D. Shackelford, the boyfriend of Annie Potts's character, Mary Jo Shively). They have two sons. Gilliland played Captain Stan Cotter on 24 while Smart later played First Lady Martha Logan on the same series. Gilliland died after a brief illness in March 2021.

Filmography

Awards and nominations

She is the recipient of numerous awards, including multiple Primetime Emmy Awards and a Tony Award nomination. Smart has been nominated for 11 Primetime Emmy Awards for her work in television, winning twice for her comedic performance in a guest-starring role in Frasier (2000, 2001), once for her performance in Samantha Who? (2008), and twice back to back for her performance in Hacks (2021). She was also nominated for the Tony Award for Best Actress in a Play for her performance in the Broadway revival of the George S. Kaufman play The Man Who Came to Dinner (2001). In 2000 she earned an Independent Spirit Award nomination for Guinevere and in 2007 she earned a Screen Actors Guild Award nomination along with the ensemble cast of the drama series 24. She has won the Critics' Choice Television Award twice for Fargo (2015) and Watchmen (2020).

References 
Notes

Sources

External links 

 
 
 
 

1951 births
Living people
20th-century American actresses
21st-century American actresses
American film actresses
American stage actresses
American television actresses
American voice actresses
Actresses from Seattle
University of Washington School of Drama alumni
Ballard High School (Seattle, Washington) alumni
Outstanding Performance by a Lead Actress in a Comedy Series Primetime Emmy Award winners
Outstanding Performance by a Supporting Actress in a Comedy Series Primetime Emmy Award winners
People with type 1 diabetes